Mirrored Aztec is the 31st studio album by American indie rock band Guided by Voices.

Track listing

Personnel

Guided by Voices 

 Robert Pollard – lead vocals
 Bobby Bare Jr. – guitar
 Doug Gillard – guitar
 Kevin March – drums
 Mark Shue – bass guitar

Additional musicians 

 Montclair School of Rock Choir – vocals (track 9)

Technical 

 Ami Lane – photography
 Travis Harrison – production, engineering
 Ray Ketchum – engineering
 Jeff Phillips – mastering
 Jamal Ruhe – mastering
 Courtney Latta – cover artwork
 Robert Pollard – artwork
 Sarah Zade-Pollard – art direction

References 

Guided by Voices albums
2020 albums
Indie rock albums